European Soccer Challenge is an association football (soccer) video game developed by Smash 16 and distributed by Software Sorcery for the Amiga and Amstrad CPC in 1990.

Reception
The game was reviewed in Commodore Format Magazine in which the reviewer felt the movement was jerky and called the game "agony" to play, only giving the score of 20%

References

External links 
 Game at Lemonamiga

1990 video games
Association football video games
Amiga games
Amstrad CPC games
Commodore 64 games
Video games developed in the United Kingdom
Video games scored by Matt Furniss
ZX Spectrum games
Multiplayer and single-player video games